Lithocarpus lucidus is a tree in the beech family Fagaceae. The specific epithet lucidus is from the Latin meaning "shining", referring to the acorn and leaf surface.

Description
The brown bark is smooth.

Distribution and habitat
Lithocarpus lucidus grows naturally in Thailand, Peninsular Malaysia, Singapore, Sumatra and Borneo. Its habitat is mixed dipterocarp to montane forests up to  altitude.

Uses
The timber is locally used in construction.

References

lucidus
Flora of Thailand
Flora of Malaya
Flora of Sumatra
Flora of Borneo
Plants described in 1832